Dolecta is a genus of moths in the family Cossidae. It is endemic to the Neotropical biogeographic region.

Species
24 species are recognized in this genus, plus one more of uncertain taxonomic placement:
 Dolecta akhmatovae  (named after Russian poet Anna Akhmatova)
 Dolecta amanosa 
 Dolecta aroa 
 Dolecta bulgakovi  (named after Russian writer Mikhail Bulgakov)
 Dolecta chekhovi  (named after Russian writer and playwright Anton Chekhov)
 Dolecta dostoevskyi  (named after Russian writer Fyodor Dostoevsky)
 Dolecta egipan 
 Dolecta esenini  (named after Russian poet Sergei Yesenin, or Esenin)
 Dolecta gertseni  (named after Russian writer and thinker Alexander Herzen, or Gertsen)
 Dolecta gogoli  (named after Russian writer Nikolai Gogol)
 Dolecta invenusta Schaus, 1892 (taxonomic status unclear, may belong to the genus Givira)
 Dolecta juturna Schaus, 1892
 Dolecta karamzini  (named after Russian historian and writer Nikolay Karamzin)
 Dolecta lermontovi  (named after Russian writer, poat and painter Mikhail Lermontov)
 Dolecta macrochir Schaus, 1892
 Dolecta morosa (Schaus, 1911)
 Dolecta nekrasovi  (named after Russian poet and writer Nikolay Nekrasov)
 Dolecta ostrovskyi  (named after Russian playwright Alexander Ostrovsky)
 Dolecta pushkini  (named after Russian poet, playwright and writer Alexander Pushkin)
 Dolecta rubtsovi  (named after Russian poet Nikolay Rubtsov)
 Dolecta saltykovishchedrini  (named after Russian writer Mikhail Saltykov-Shchedrin)
 Dolecta scariosa Herrich-Schäffer, 1854 (type species)
 Dolecta stanyukovichi  (named after Russian writer Konstantin Stanyukovich)
 Dolecta tolstoyi  (named after Russian writer Leo Tolstoy)
 Dolecta turgenevi  (named after Russian writer, poet and playwright Ivan Turgenev)

References

External links
Natural History Museum Lepidoptera generic names catalog

Cossidae genera
Cossidae